was a daimyō (feudal lord) of Aki Province during Japan's Sengoku period. He was the eldest legitimate son of Mōri Okimoto. 

His father died young so he inherited as head of the Mōri clan when he was only an infant. He died when he was only seven or eight years old and was succeeded by his uncle, the famous Mōri Motonari.

See also
Mōri Motonari
Mōri Okimoto
Mōri clan

References

1515 births
1523 deaths
Mōri clan
Daimyo